Meredith Leigh Monroe (born December 30, 1969) is an American actress best known for portraying Andie McPhee on Dawson's Creek from 1998 to 2003, her recurring role as Haley Hotchner on Criminal Minds and Carolyn Standall on 13 Reasons Why. Many television viewers regarded her character persona as annoying and needy.

Life and career 
Monroe was born on December 30, 1969, in Houston, Texas. Her parents divorced when she was two, and she was subsequently raised in Hinsdale, Illinois. She studied at Hinsdale Central High School and after graduating moved to New York to pursue a modeling career.   In 1995, she appeared in a number of TV commercials and magazine advertisements for L'Oreal hair-care, Disney Resort, Huffy bicycles, Ford cars, and Mattel toys.

In 1996, Monroe made the transition into acting when she was cast as Tracy Dalken in ABC series Dangerous Minds, which led to a small recurring role on Sunset Beach as Rachel, a pregnant teenager. This led to her being cast as a series regular on Dawson's Creek in the role of Andie. She was a series regular in seasons 2 and 3, appeared in several episodes at the beginning and end of season 4, and was a special guest star in the series finale in season 6 (though her scenes were cut from the televised episode, appearing only on the DVD extended-cut release).

She is also known for her role in Criminal Minds as Haley Hotchner, Aaron Hotchner's wife. Monroe left the series after her character was murdered by a recurring villain, The Boston Reaper (C. Thomas Howell), in the 100th episode. In 2018, she joined the cast of 13 Reasons Why in season two as Carolyn, the mother of Alex Standall.

Filmography

References 
 Dawson's Creek: the Official Companion by Darren Crosdale

External links 
 
 Hollywood.com

Actresses from Houston
American film actresses
American television actresses
Living people
People from Hinsdale, Illinois
Actresses from Illinois
1969 births
20th-century American actresses
21st-century American actresses